The Light of the Sun is the fourth studio album by American singer Jill Scott. It was recorded after Scott's four-year break from her music career and departure from her former label, Hidden Beach Recordings. The Light of the Sun was recorded at several studios and produced primarily by Scott and JR Hutson, a songwriter and producer who had previously worked on her 2007 record The Real Thing: Words and Sounds Vol. 3. Music journalists noted The Light of the Sun for its neo soul sound, element of improvisation, and Scott's themes of emotion and womanhood.

The Light of the Sun was released on June 21, 2011, by Scott's imprint label, Blue Babe Records. It received positive reviews from most critics and debuted at number one on the Billboard 200 in the United States, where it sold 135,000 copies in its first week. The album became Scott's first American number-one record, and as of March 2015, it had sold 478,000 copies in the US. It was promoted with three singles: "So in Love", "So Gone (What My Mind Says)", and "Blessed". Scott also promoted the album with her Summer Block Party concert tour.

Background 
Following her 2007 album, The Real Thing: Words and Sounds Vol. 3, Scott took a break from recording music. She undertook acting roles in the movies Tyler Perry's Why Did I Get Married? and Hounddog, and she had a starring role in the television series The No. 1 Ladies' Detective Agency. During her break, she divorced her husband of six years Lyzel Williams in 2007, became engaged to the former drummer Lil' John Roberts in 2008, gave birth to their son Jett Hamilton in 2009, and broke up with Roberts. Scott subsequently began sessions for The Light of the Sun.

In 2009, Scott left her former record label Hidden Beach Recordings. During the album's recording, she was sued by Hidden Beach, which claimed she had left without fulfilling a six-album contract. The lawsuit was settled in 2011, with Hidden Beach planning to release the compilation album The Original Jill Scott from the Vault, Vol. 1 in August, the first in a planned album series of Scott's previously unreleased recordings. In 2010, Warner Bros. Records signed Scott to a deal that gave her direct control over her marketing and promotion. In a strategy to re-establish Scott's presence with fans, she signed a multi-tour deal with Live Nation/Haymon Ventures to expand her concert touring. Scott co-headlined a national, 20-date arena tour with the recording artist Maxwell, called Maxwell & Jill Scott: The Tour, in 2010.

Recording 
The album was recorded at several recording studios, including Fever Recording Studios in North Hollywood, 9th Street Studios and Threshold Sound & Vision in Santa Monica, Studio 609 and The Studio in Philadelphia, The Boom Boom Room in Burbank and The Village Studios in West Los Angeles. Scott worked with producers Terry Lewis, JR Hutson and Justice League for the album. Scott had first worked with Hutson on her previous album The Real Thing.

In an interview for HitQuarters, Hutson said of Scott's approach to The Light of the Sun, "She's now in charge of a lot of different things and with it comes a lot of trials and tribulations, and I think her goal is to just give people a very realistic glimpse of where she is in her life right now." Scott has noted songs such as "Hear My Call" and "Quick" as reflective of the "darkest moments" in her life and has said that much of the album's music developed from studio jams and freestyle sessions. In an interview for Metro, she said of the "largely improvised" recording process:

Release and promotion 

The album was released in the United States on June 21, 2011, on Scott's own imprint label, Blues Babe Records, distributed by Warner Bros. Records, her first release by the label. It is the first release under the distribution deal between Blues Babe and Warner Bros. It was released on June 27 in the United Kingdom. In the first week of release, the album debuted at number one on the Billboard 200, selling 135,000 copies in the US. It was her first number-one album there. It sold 55,000 copies the following week, and by May 2015, it had sold 479,000 copies.

The album's first single, "So in Love" featuring Anthony Hamilton, was released on June 26. It spent nine weeks on the US Billboard Hot R&B/Hip-Hop Songs, peaking at number 10 on the chart, one week on the Billboard Hot 100, peaking at number 97, and three weeks on Billboards Radio Songs, peaking at number 71 on the chart. This had been preceded by the April release of "Shame" on Scott's SoundCloud account, featuring rapper Eve and vocal ensemble The A Group. Its music video was filmed at the Cecil B. Moore Recreational Center in Philadelphia, where Eve and the rapper Black Thought were in attendance. Scott said in an interview for CNN that she spent several summers at the recreation center and that it was at risk of being demolished. The video was premiered on April 13 on Essence.com. It was later released as the album's second single in the United Kingdom.

Scott promoted the album with her Summer Block Party concert tour, beginning on July 28, 2012, and concluding on August 28. The tour featured Anthony Hamilton and Mint Condition as opening acts, Doug E. Fresh as a host, and Jazzy Jeff as the DJ. Scott also promoted the album with performances on the television shows The Tonight Show with Jay Leno, Jimmy Kimmel Live! and Live with Regis and Kelly. She headlined the Essence Music Festival on July 1. On December 18th, Scott co-headlined VH1 Divas Celebrates Soul alongside Mary J. Blige, Jennifer Hudson, Kelly Clarkson, Florence + the Machine, and Jessie J, performing "Hear My Call" and collaborating with The Roots and Erykah Badu on "You Got Me."

Critical reception 

The Light of the Sun received generally positive reviews from critics. At Metacritic, which assigns a normalized rating out of 100 to reviews from mainstream publications, the album received an average score of 73, based on 15 reviews. Mikael Wood from Entertainment Weekly complimented its "earnest introspection and earthy textures", and observed "a distinctly early-aughties vibe". In The New York Times, Jon Pareles praised Scott's "proudly and forthrightly feminine" themes and said the songs are "springy with a sense of improvisation, both in the rhythms and in their elaborate vocal overlays". The Washington Posts Bill Friskics-Warren noted its "sumptuous orchestration, jazzy flourishes and neo-soul beats", and wrote, "The full range of human emotion, from defiance to hurt and hope, is expressed over the course of the album." AllMusic's Thom Jurek said that "Scott sounds more in control than ever; her spoken and sung phrasing (now a trademark), songwriting, and production instincts are all solid". In the Chicago Tribune, Greg Kot wrote, "She's perfected a style that toggles between singing and conversing, and balances more conventional pop structure with spontaneity." Caroline Sullivan in The Guardian noted its "uplifting sung-spoken pieces" and wrote, "It's Scott's warm womanliness over the whole album that makes it a must-hear."

In a mixed review, Andy Gill from The Independent criticized Scott's lyrics as "a sticky puddle of self-regard" and found its songs "[un]developed much beyond a languid soul–jazz vamp". Rolling Stone writer Jon Dolan gave the album three out of five stars and called her "trademark" musical style "warm and inviting, if rarely thrilling, neo-soul". Daryl Easlea of BBC Online wrote that it "at times [...] veers towards self-indulgence, and some of its ideas are not fully followed through", but complimented its "freewheeling vibe" and called it "a lovely, bittersweet album that celebrates the joy of life".

Track listing 

Notes
  signifies a co-producer

Personnel 
Credits are adapted from the album's liner notes.

 The A Group – background vocals
 Nathaniel Alford – engineer
 Yameen Allworld – background vocals
 Sherlen Archibald – publicity
 Ashaunna Ayars – marketing
 Todd Bergman – assistant
 Michelle Bishop – violin
Adam Blackstone – bass guitar, electric bass, keyboards, producer
 Randy Bowland – 7-string electric guitar, guitar, producer
 Bruce Buechner – engineer, production engineer
 Luke Burland – publicity
 Sandra Campbell – project coordinator
 Warryn Campbell – instrumentation, producer, programming, vocal arrangement
 Chris Chambers – publicity
 Jeff Chestek – string engineer
 Sean Cooper – sound design
 Eli Davis – production coordination
 Kimre Davis – production coordination
 Aaron Draper – background vocals, percussion
 Dré – producer
 Corte Ellis – background vocals
 Luis Eric – horn
 Teresa Evans – production coordination
 Rick Friedrick – assistant
 Larry Gold – string arrangements, string conductor
 Steven Gomillion – photography
 Robert Greene – make-up
 Bernie Grundman – mastering
 Andre Harris – engineer
 Donald Hayes – horn
 J.R. Hutson – A&R, background vocals, engineer, executive producer, instrumentation, keyboards, producer, scratching
 Bruce Irvine – engineer
 Liza Joseph – A&R
 Brandon Kilgour – engineer
 Emma Kummrow – violin
 Dennis Leupold – photography
 Damien Lewis – assistant
 Jennie Lorenzo – cello
 Glen Marchese – engineer, mixing
 Khari Mateen – instrumentation, producer
 Luigi Mazzocchi – violin
 George "Spanky" McCurdy – drums, producer
 Susan Moses – stylist
 Jairus Mozee – bass, guitar
 Peter Nocella – viola
 Rickey Pageot – keyboards
 Charles Parker – violin
 Vanessa Parr – engineer
 Dave Pensado – mixing
 Rebecca Proudfoot – A&R
 Zachariah Redding – assistant
 Lacy Redway – hair stylist
 Tim Reid – marketing
 James Chul Rim – engineer, vocal engineer
 "V" Roane – background vocals
 John Roberts – drums, horn
 Montez Roberts – assistant engineer, engineer
 James Darrell Robinson – drums, producer
 Eric Rousseau – sound design
 Jill Scott – A&R, art direction, background vocals, executive producer, producer, vocal arrangement
 Phillip "Logann" Scott III – engineer
 Paris Strother – keyboards
 Sean Tallman – engineer
 Phil Tan – mixing
 Vidal – producer
 Courtney Walter – design
 Ayana Webb – background vocals
 Kelvin Wooten – bass guitar, drum programming, guitar, keyboards, piano, producer
 Eric Wortham – keyboards, producer

Charts

Weekly charts

Year-end charts

See also
 List of Billboard 200 number-one albums of 2011
 List of Billboard number-one R&B albums of 2011

References

External links 
 
 

2011 albums
Albums produced by Dre & Vidal
Albums produced by Warryn Campbell
Jill Scott (singer) albums
Warner Records albums